Lamoria anella is a species of snout moth described by Michael Denis and Ignaz Schiffermüller in 1775 found in Africa, Asia and Europe.

Description
The wingspan is 18–28 mm in the male and 30–40 mm in the female. Head, thorax and abdomen greyish brown. Forewings grey brown, often entirely suffused with red or fuscous. There is an indistinct highly dentate antemedial line. A more or less developed speck in the cell and discocellular spot. A highly dentate postmedial line sharply angled on vein 4 and often reduced to streaks on the veins. A marginal specks series present. Hindwings pale semi-hyaline, suffused with fuscous towards margin.

Distribution
It is found in most of Europe (except Ireland, Great Britain, Fennoscandia, Denmark, the Baltic region and Slovenia), the Canary Islands, as well as North Africa (including Tunisia, Morocco and Egypt), South Africa, India, Afghanistan, Sri Lanka and the United Arab Emirates.

The first confirmed British record was recorded in a garden at Hartford, Huntingdonshire on 5 October 2018, possibly as a migrant.

References

Tirathabini
Moths described in 1775
Moths of Africa
Moths of Asia
Moths of Europe
Taxa named by Michael Denis
Taxa named by Ignaz Schiffermüller